Viktor Jelenić (born 31 October 1970 in Belgrade, Serbia, SFR Yugoslavia) is a former Serbian water polo player. He was part of the gold medal winning team of Yugoslavia at the 1991 World Championship. He played on the bronze medal squad of FR Yugoslavia at the 2000 Summer Olympics and the silver medal squad of Serbia and Montenegro at the 2004 Summer Olympics.

He spent 2005/06 season playing for Savona.

See also
 List of Olympic medalists in water polo (men)
 List of world champions in men's water polo
 List of World Aquatics Championships medalists in water polo

References

 Serbian Olympic Committee

External links
 

1970 births
Living people
Serbian male water polo players
Serbia and Montenegro male water polo players
Yugoslav male water polo players
Water polo players at the 1996 Summer Olympics
Water polo players at the 2000 Summer Olympics
Water polo players at the 2004 Summer Olympics
Olympic water polo players of Yugoslavia
Olympic water polo players of Serbia and Montenegro
Olympic bronze medalists for Federal Republic of Yugoslavia
Olympic silver medalists for Serbia and Montenegro
Sportspeople from Belgrade
Olympic medalists in water polo
Medalists at the 2004 Summer Olympics
World Aquatics Championships medalists in water polo
Medalists at the 2000 Summer Olympics